The 2014 FIBA Europe Under-20 Championship for Women Division B was the 10th edition of the Division B of the Women's European basketball championship for national under-20 teams. It was held in Sofia, Bulgaria, from 3 to 13 July 2014. Germany women's national under-20 basketball team won the tournament.

Participating teams

  (14th place, 2013 FIBA Europe Under-20 Championship for Women Division A)

  (15th place, 2013 FIBA Europe Under-20 Championship for Women Division A)

  (16th place, 2013 FIBA Europe Under-20 Championship for Women Division A)

Final standings

Results

References

2014
2014–15 in European women's basketball
International youth basketball competitions hosted by Bulgaria
FIBA U20
July 2014 sports events in Europe